Monmouth is a census-designated place in Fresno County, California. At the 2010 census, Monmouth had a population of 152.

Officials of the Atchison, Topeka and Santa Fe Railroad (Monmouth was a stop on the railroad's Valley Division) named the place after Monmouth, Illinois.

A post office operated at Monmouth from 1908 to 1919.

Demographics
At the 2010 census Monmouth had a population of 152. The racial makeup of Monmouth was 82 (53.9%) White, 6 (3.9%) African American, 1 (0.7%) Native American, 5 (3.3%) Asian, 0 (0.0%) Pacific Islander, 47 (30.9%) from other races, and 11 (7.2%) from two or more races. Hispanic or Latino of any race were 107 people (70.4%).

The whole population lived in households, no one lived in non-institutionalized group quarters and no one was institutionalized.

There were 42 households, 16 (38.1%) had children under the age of 18 living in them, 21 (50.0%) were opposite-sex married couples living together, 15 (35.7%) had a female householder with no husband present, 1 (2.4%) had a male householder with no wife present.  There were 4 (9.5%) unmarried opposite-sex partnerships, and 0 (0%) same-sex married couples or partnerships. 2 households (4.8%) were one person and 0 (0%) had someone living alone who was 65 or older. The average household size was 3.62.  There were 37 families (88.1% of households); the average family size was 3.70.

The age distribution was 37 people (24.3%) under the age of 18, 22 people (14.5%) aged 18 to 24, 29 people (19.1%) aged 25 to 44, 36 people (23.7%) aged 45 to 64, and 28 people (18.4%) who were 65 or older.  The median age was 34.0 years. For every 100 females, there were 90.0 males.  For every 100 females age 18 and over, there were 91.7 males.

There were 48 housing units at an average density of ,of which 42 were occupied, 28 (66.7%) by the owners and 14 (33.3%) by renters.  The homeowner vacancy rate was 0%; the rental vacancy rate was 6.7%.  107 people (70.4% of the population) lived in owner-occupied housing units and 45 people (29.6%) lived in rental housing units.

References

Populated places established in 1908
Census-designated places in Fresno County, California
1908 establishments in California
Census-designated places in California